"Addictive" is a song by American R&B singer Truth Hurts. It was released as the lead single from her debut album, Truthfully Speaking (2002), on April 1, 2002. "Addictive" features a verse from hip-hop rapper Rakim and is based on a Hindi music sample, which eventually brought on a $500 million lawsuit against Aftermath. The song was her only one to chart on the US Billboard Hot 100, peaking at number nine. It was also a top-five hit in several European countries, achieving gold status in Belgium, France, and Switzerland. The song instrumental was sampled in the Jamaican dancehall beat "Bollywood Riddim".

Background
Steve "Static Major" Garrett wrote the song's lyrics, and the record was produced by DJ Quik. Quik sampled for its instrumental track a Hindi-song he heard on television early one morning. The sample turned out to be "Thoda Resham Lagta Hai", a 1981 song by Indian singer Lata Mangeshkar for the 1981 movie Jyoti, which Aftermath neglected to clear the rights to. Copyright holders Saregama India, Ltd. issued a cease-and-desist order, which went unheeded. On September 12, 2002, Saregama filed a $500 million lawsuit against Aftermath and parent company Universal Music Group, and filed an injunction to prevent further performances or broadcasts of the "Addictive" song. The song additionally samples "Do It ('Til You're Satisfied)" by B.T. Express, and the first line of Rakim's rap, "Thinking of a master plan," also serves the opening lyric from his 1987 song "Paid in Full".

Although DJ Quik was credited as the solo producer, he confirmed the song was produced by Dr. Dre. In the album's liner notes, Dr. Dre is credited only as a mixer.

Track listings

UK CD single
 "Addictive" (album version) – 3:46
 "Addictive" (remix) – 4:55
 "Addictive" (instrumental) – 3:46
 "Addictive" (video CD-ROM)

UK 12-inch single
A1. "Addictive" (album version) – 3:46
A2. "Addictive" (instrumental) – 3:46
B1. "Addictive" (remix) – 4:55

UK cassette single
 "Addictive" (album version) – 3:46
 "Addictive" (remix) – 4:55

European CD single
 "Addictive" (album version)
 "Addictive" (remix radio edit)

Credits and personnel
Credits are taken from the Truthfully Speaking album booklet.

Studios
 Recorded at Encore Studios (Burbank, California) and Larrabee (Los Angeles)
 Mixed at Encore Studios (Burbank, California)
 Mastered at Bernie Grundman Mastering (Hollywood, California)

Personnel

 Static Major – writing (as Stephen Garret)
 Rakim – writing (as Willian Griffin), featured vocals, production
 DJ Quik – writing (as David Blake), percussion
 Billy Nichols – writing ("Do It ('Til You're Satisfied)")
 Truth Hurts – vocals (as Shari Watson)
 Erick Coomes – bass
 Bryan Brock – percussion
 Mauricio "Veto" Iragorri – recording
 Chris Puram – recording
 Farah Fima – recording assistant
 Thomas Rounds – recording assistant
 James "Flea" McCrone – recording assistant
 Francis Forde – recording assistant
 Dr. Dre – mixing, production (uncredited)
 Kevin "Kirv" Irving – vocal arrangement
 Brian "Big Bass" Gardner – mastering

Charts

Weekly charts

Year-end charts

Certifications and sales

Release history

References

2002 debut singles
2002 songs
Male–female vocal duets
Rakim songs
Sampling controversies
Song recordings produced by DJ Quik
Songs written by DJ Quik
Songs written by Static Major
Truth Hurts songs